Erkki Mustakari (born 13 March 1946) is a Finnish athlete and sports journalist. He competed in the men's pole vault at the 1968 Summer Olympics.

Personal life
Estonian-born Finnish athlete Kalevi Kotkas was Mustakari's maternal uncle. He lives in Mallorca, Spain.

References

External links
 

1946 births
Living people
Athletes (track and field) at the 1968 Summer Olympics
Finnish male pole vaulters
Olympic athletes of Finland
Place of birth missing (living people)
Finnish expatriate sportspeople in Spain
Finnish people of Estonian descent
Finnish sports journalists